Kenia Olvera  (born ) is a retired Mexican female volleyball player, who played as a middle blocker.

She was part of the Mexico women's national volleyball team at the 2002 FIVB Volleyball Women's World Championship in Germany. She also competed at the 2002 Central American and Caribbean Games and 2003 Women's Pan-American Volleyball Cup. On club level she played with UNAM.

Clubs
 UNAM (2002)

References

1975 births
Living people
Mexican women's volleyball players
Place of birth missing (living people)